Cohoes is an incorporated city located in the northeast corner of Albany County in the U.S. state of New York. It is called the "Spindle City" because of the importance of textile manufacturing to its growth in the 19th century. The city's factories processed cotton from the Deep South.

As of the 2010 census, the city population was 16,168. The name Cohoes is believed to be derived from a Mohawk term, Ga-ha-oose, referring to the Cohoes Falls and meaning "Place of the Falling Canoe," an interpretation noted by Horatio Gates Spafford in his 1823 publication "A Gazetteer of the State of New York". Later historians posited that the name is derived from the Algonquian Cohoes, a place name based on a word meaning 'pine tree'.

History
In the early years of Dutch colonial settlement, the majority of the city's territory was once part of the area of Manor of Rensselaerswyck, a feudal-style manor or patroonship. The land north of a line crossing the Cohoes Falls (today Manor Avenue) was outside the Manor and was owned by the Van Olohde family between 1725 and 1750. Rensselaerswyck was established by Killiaen Van Rensselaer, the patroon and a Dutch merchant. In 1632, he had an agent pace off an enormous triangle-shaped area around the confluence of the Mohawk and Hudson rivers, from the Peebles Island northwest to the Cohoes Falls and south to today's Watervliet; this area was the core of the future city of Cohoes. Starting in the 1690s the Patroon began to issue leases for the area of Cohoes, reserving for himself a strip below the Cohoes Falls for the future site of mills powered by water.

Though the area was not much settled for a time, it was known for the Cohoes Falls. One of the earliest descriptions of the falls was in 1642 by Johannes Megapolensis, the first dominie (Dutch Reformed pastor) of Beverwyck. Another early description was in 1656 by Adriaen van der Donck in his Description of New Netherland. In the early-to-mid 17th century, a whale swam upriver in the Hudson, becoming stranded in the Mohawk River on an island just below the Cohoes Falls. The Dutch settlers could not easily get to the large carcass to remove it. As it rotted, the river became slick for three weeks. A settler commented that "the air was infected with its stench... perceptible for two miles to leeward." Beginning about 1646, settlers called this land Whale Island.

During the various French and Indian Wars of the mid-18th century, Van Schaick Island was developed as part of a military road that came from Albany north along the islands at the mouth of the Mohawk River. These islands allowed for easier fords across the various mouths of the Mohawk and access to Waterford and points north. The islands were used for numerous military encampments during both the French and Indian Wars and the American Revolutionary War.

The Van Schaick Mansion on Van Schaick Island was built in the 1730s; it was one of the sites used as a military headquarters during the Revolution by the Americans under Major Generals Philip Schuyler and Horatio Gates. Van Schaick Island was the first part of Cohoes to be settled and farmed; it was formerly known as Cohoes Island and Anthony's Island.

Until after the Revolutionary War, Cohoes was a small quiet hamlet with isolated farms. After the Mohawk and other Iroquois allies of the British were forced to cede their territory, New York encouraged new settlement. Thousands of Yankee settlers came from New England. Cohoes was linked to the larger settlements of Lansingburg and Albany. In 1795 the first bridge across the Mohawk River was constructed at Cohoes. It was 900 feet long, 24 feet wide, 15 feet high, and was based on 13 stone piers. It cost $12,000 to build and was a toll bridge. This bridge provided access to Cohoes as one of the main routes north. The bridge was rebuilt in 1806 by the Cohoes Bridge Company, which raised the tolls to cover the cost.

Another major transportation improvement, construction of the Erie and Champlain canals were begun in 1817. The section in Cohoes was finished in 1823, stimulating trade for the city. Cohoes was known as Juncta because of being served by the two canals, which improved water traffic north to Lake Champlain and west through the Mohawk Valley. One or both of the canals crossed every farm in Cohoes. Even with the canals and the bridge bringing easier access to larger markets, Cohoes was a sleepy place prior to 1831. The nearest post office was at Waterford; fresh meat and produce were available mostly by residents raising their own. A United States post office was built in Cohoes in 1831.

In 1811 the Cohoes Manufacturing Company, owned entirely by men from Lansingburg, was incorporated and began a factory for making screws. This was the first large industry in Cohoes to use the power of the Mohawk River and Cohoes Falls.

In 1831, a new Cohoes Company constructed a dam on the Mohawk River above the city's waterfall in order to better regulate water flow for industrial use. It was soon swept away by ice at the break-up in spring, and a new dam was built the following year. Two canals extended from the dam to provide water power for industry. Ironworks were the first main industry in Cohoes, as it was in Troy, Menands, and West Troy. Daniel Simmons' Simmons Axe Company was famous throughout the United States, and the Cohoes Iron Foundry was a large business enterprise in the 1830s.

In the 1820s, the first cotton mill in Albany County was built in Cohoes. Egberts and Bailey was the first factory to use knitting machinery run by power, based on the Cohoes Company's power canals.

The community became a center of textile manufacturing; in 1836 the Harmony Manufacturing Company was founded, later famous as Harmony Mills. Cohoes became a mill town, and to an extent a company town. During the 1870s the mills were enormously profitable because of the Erie Canal, which flowed past them at that time. Cotton textiles were shipped to New York City, England and Europe, where demand was high.

In 1848, Cohoes was incorporated as a village within the town of Watervliet. In 1869 it was chartered as a city.

In 1866, during excavation work for construction of Mill #3 of the Harmony Mills, the bones of a mastodon were unearthed over a period of several weeks. This mammal ranged in this territory when humans were first settling here.

The Cohoes Mastodon skeleton was long on display in the lobby of the New York State Museum in Albany, New York. Since the early 21st century, the skeleton has been moved to a new location away from the windows, where temperature and humidity fluctuations risked damaging the skeleton. A replica complete with fur is on display at the Cohoes Public Library.

Upon their completion, in 1872, the Harmony Mills were the largest cotton mill complex in the world. The Harmony Mills are an excellent example of 19th-century mill architecture. During the 19th century, numerous immigrants came to Cohoes to work in the mills, particularly French Canadians from Quebec and Irish, who first arrived as refugees in the 1840s from the Great Famine. The Harmony Mills Historic District was listed on the National Register of Historic Places in the late 20th century.

Around the start of the 20th century, daredevil Bobby Leach practiced going over the Cohoes Falls in a barrel before he performed the same stunt at Niagara. Cohoes residents watched this feat from the lawn or the porch of The Cataract House, the Victorian hotel at the corner of North Mohawk and School streets. This site was later developed as the present School Street Power Station.

From 2005 to 2013, the Harmony Mills were redeveloped and restored by real estate developer Uri Kaufman. Kaufman converted the Mills to luxury loft apartments, sparking a revival in the heart of the city.

On November 30, 2017, there was a massive fire that destroyed and damaged 21 buildings that caught the attention of national media. An amateur blacksmith, attempting to mimic the show Forged in Fire, started a barrel fire to forge with before losing control of it. High winds stoked the flames which spread over the course of six hours. At one point smoke and fire collectively consumed three blocks of the downtown district, and a plume of smoke rose over the city large enough to be detected by weather radar. Twenty-one buildings were heavily damaged or destroyed, with two businesses and a garage being completely leveled.

Geography

Cohoes is situated at the confluence of the Mohawk with the Hudson River, where the Mohawk forms several channels and islands. Cohoes is named for its most famous landmark, the Cohoes Falls, a majestic waterfall first seen by the area's successive generations of indigenous peoples. In the historic era, these were the Mohawk Nation. The city includes Van Schaick Island, where the historic Van Schaick Mansion is located, and Simmons Island.

Within Albany County, the city has the town of Colonie to its northwest, west, and south; with the town and village of Green Island to the south of Van Schaick Island. To the north across the Mohawk River is Saratoga County and the town of Waterford's hamlet of Northside. A bridge connects Cohoes to Waterford. To the east of Van Schaick Island across the Hudson River is Rensselaer County and the city of Troy's Lansingburg neighborhood. The 112th Street Bridge connects Van Schaick Island to Troy.

Demographics

As of the census of 2010, there were 16,168. people (677 more than the 2000 census), 7,001 households, and 3,902 families residing in the city. The population density was 4,145.8 people per square mile (1,602.3/km). There were 7,689 housing units at an average density of 2,053.8 per square mile (793.8/km). The racial makeup of the city was 84.14% White, 12.16% African American, 0.16% Native American, 0.68% Asian, 0.04% Pacific Islander, 0.59% from other races, and 1.23% from two or more races. Hispanic or Latino of any race were 3.03% of the population.

There were 6,932 households, out of which 25.9% had children under the age of 18 living with them, 36.4% were married couples living together, 15.3% had a female householder with no husband present, and 44.3% were non-families. 38.0% of all households were made up of individuals, and 15.6% had someone living alone who was 65 years of age or older. The average household size was 2.20 and the average family size was 2.91.

In the city, the population was spread out, with 22.4% under the age of 18, 8.5% from 18 to 24, 29.3% from 25 to 44, 22.5% from 45 to 64, and 17.3% who were 65 years of age or older. The median age was 38 years. For every 100 females, there were 86.1 males. For every 100 females age 18 and over, there were 81.6 males.

The median income for a household in the city was $32,856, and the median income for a family was $42,054. Males had a median income of $31,972 versus $25,845 for females. The per capita income for the city was $18,416. About 11.2% of families and 13.3% of the population were below the poverty line, including 22.9% of those under age 18 and 6.3% of those age 65 or over.

Arts and culture

Historic sites
A number of sites in Cohoes are included on the U.S. National Register of Historic Places, including -
 Cohoes Music Hall
 Delaware and Hudson Railroad Freight House
 William J. Dickey House
 Downtown Cohoes Historic District
 Enlarged Erie Canal Historic District (Discontiguous)
 Fonda House
 Godfrey Farmhouse
 Harmony Mill No. 3
 Harmony Mills Historic District
 J. Leonard Lackman House
 Lock 18 of Enlarged Erie Canal
 Matton Shipyard
 Olmstead Street Historic District
 Silliman Memorial Presbyterian Church
 Van Schaick House

Infrastructure

Transportation
New York State Route 787 has its northern terminus in Cohoes. New York State Route 32 runs north–south through Cohoes. New York State Route 470 crosses east–west through the city and goes over the Hudson River to the northern parts of Troy.

Until the mid-1950s, the Delaware and Hudson Railroad ran the Laurentian train (New York - Montreal), making a stop at its station in Cohoes. Until the early 1960s, the D&H ran trains from Albany to Saratoga Springs that made stops in Cohoes.

Notable people
 Charles H. Adams served as mayor from 1870 to 1872 and as US Congressman from 1877 to 1879.
 Ron Canestrari served as mayor from 1976 to 1988 and as Assemblyman from 1988 to 2013, becoming Majority Leader in 2007.
 George Davis was a 1906 World Series-winning shortstop and a New York Giants manager during the early 20th Century who was inducted in the National Baseball Hall of Fame.
 James Lafferty (1837–1872), Wisconsin politician
 Harold E. Rosecrans was a Brigadier General in the Marine Corps during World War II.

In popular culture
Author Kurt Vonnegut's character, writer Kilgore Trout, was said to have been a resident of Cohoes in his story, "Requiem for a Dreamer".

References

External links

Cohoes official website
Cohoes Chamber of Commerce
Spindle City Historic Society

 
Cities in New York (state)
Company towns in New York (state)
Cities in Albany County, New York
Populated places established in 1848
New York (state) populated places on the Hudson River
Populated places on the Mohawk River